Grindley Plateau is a high icecapped plateau in the central Queen Alexandra Range of Antarctica, bordered by the peaks of Mount Mackellar, Mount Bell and Mount Kirkpatrick. It was named by the Northern Party of the New Zealand Geological Survey Antarctic Expedition (1961–62) for George Grindley, senior geologist of the party.

See also
Levi Peak

References

Plateaus of Antarctica
Landforms of the Ross Dependency
Shackleton Coast